Showt County is in West Azerbaijan province, Iran. The capital of the county is the city of Showt. At the 2006 census, the region's population (as Showt District of Maku County) was 51,476 in 11,769 households. The following census in 2011 counted 52,519 people in the newly formed Showt County, in 13,572 households. At the 2016 census, the county's population was 55,682 in 15,756 households.

Administrative divisions

The population history and structural changes of Showt County's administrative divisions over three consecutive censuses are shown in the following table. The latest census shows two districts, four rural districts, and two cities.

References

 

Counties of West Azerbaijan Province